The Mosque and Mausoleum of Amir Ahmad al-Mihmandar which is also referred to as the al-Mihmandariyya college (madrasa)was founded during the third reign of al-Nasir Muhammad in the area of Darb al-Ahmar in Cairo.

Founder
This institution was founded by the amir Ahmad al-Mihmandar. He held the position of naqib al-jaysh, which was similar to chief of military police.

Historical Background

The complex was built in the month of Muharram 725 AH/1324-5 CE. According to al-Maqrizi, it included a college (madrasa), that included instruction in the Hanafi legal school four students, and a Sufi hospice (khanqah). The founder also built a market (qaysariyya) and an apartment complex (rab') that were still there during al-Maqrizi's time.

References

Mamluk architecture in Egypt
14th-century mosques
Mosques in Cairo